Thelliyoor  is a village Near Thiruvalla in Pathanamthitta district in the state of Kerala, India.

Demographics
 India census, Thelliyoor had a population of 8236 with 3859 males and 4377 females.

Thelliyoor is a village in Pathanamthitta district 14 km from Thiruvalla town situated in Kerala. The village is gifted by nature being surrounded by greenery & waterfalls. Thelliyoor is rich with the presence of Devi Thelliyoor Kavillama.  History says that it was a Kavu (forest attached to the temple) in which the snakes monkeys, etc. lived

References

Villages in Pathanamthitta district